RTL Crime (stylized as RTL CRIME since 15 September 2021) is a German pay television channel owned by the RTL Group. The channel was launched on 27 November 2006. Its programming is centred towards action and crime series.

Distribution
Since 1 October 2007, RTL Crime was launched on Sky Deutschland. On 1 September 2011, a localised feed of the channel was launched in the Netherlands.

On 15 May 2012, the channel launched its own high-definition simulcast feed, which started to be carried on Unitymedia. On 25 September 2014, RTL Crime HD was launched on Sky Deutschland.

Since 1 August 2017, the channel is also available in HD at Kabel Deutschland in the "HD Premium" package.

Programming

Abschnitt 40 (2011-2014)
Agents of S.H.I.E.L.D. (Marvel's Agents of S.H.I.E.L.D.) (2014–present)
Altes Geld (2016-2018)
American Gods (2018–present)
Arrow (2014–present)
Ash vs Evil Dead (2016–present)
Autopsy (Autopsie - Mysteriöse Todesfälle) (2009–present)
Balko (2006-2011, 2015–2016)
Black Mirror (2013–present)
Born to Kill? (Born to Kill - Als Mörder geboren?) (2008–present)
Born to Kill?: Class of Evil (Born to Kill - A Class of Evil) (2017)
Breakout Kings (2012–present)
Cagney & Lacey (2016–2018)
Cold Justice: Sex Crimes (2017)
Crimes of the Century (Ridley Scott: Crimes of the Century) (2014–present)
Crossbones (Crossbones - Im Reich der Piraten) (2015–present)
CSI: Cyber (2015–present)
Death Row Stories (Death Row Stories: Geschichten aus dem Todestrakt) (2016–present)
CSI: Cyber (2015–present)
Deutschland 83 (2018–present)
Dirk Gently (2012-2015)
Forensic Files (Medical Detectives – Geheimnisse der Gerichtsmedizin) (2006-2010, 2012–present)
From Dusk till Dawn: The Series (From Dusk Till Dawn - Die Serie) (2016–present)
F/X: The Series (F/X - Die Serie) (2009-2011, 2013)
Guyane (Gier - Rausch des Goldes/Ouro) (2017–present)
Hit & Miss (2013-2016)
Hostages (Die Geiseln/Bnei Aruba) (2017–present)
Humans (2016–present)
Killers: Behind the Myth (Mythos Serienkiller) (2015–present)
King (2013–2018)
Kojak (2005) (2007–2009)
Liar (2018–present)
Meadowlands (Meadowlands - Stadt der Angst) (2009-2012)
Mörder (2015–present)
Mr. Robot (2017–present)
Profiler (2016–present)
Ransom (2017–present)
Rillington Place (Rillington Place - Der Böse) (2017–present)
Ripper Street (2013–present)
Russian Dolls: Sex Trade (Matrioshki - Mädchenhändler) (2009-2015)
SK-Babies (2007-2008)
SS-GB (2017–present)
Stieg Larsson: Millennium (2016–present)
The Bureau (Büro der Legenden/Le Bureau des Légendes) (2017)
The Grid (The Grid - Netz des Terrors) (2007-2008, 2010)
Utopia (2014–present)
Vier Frauen und ein Todesfall (2008-2012, 2014–present)
White Collar (2012-2017)

Audience share

Germany

References

External links
 

Television stations in Germany
Television stations in Austria
Television stations in Switzerland
German-language television stations
Television channels and stations established in 2006
2006 establishments in Germany
Mass media in Cologne